Rose Creek is a city in Windom Township, Mower County, Minnesota, United States.  The population was 394 at the 2010 census.

History
Rose Creek was laid out in 1868 when the railroad was extended to that point. The city was named for nearby Rose Creek. A post office was established at Rose Creek in 1868. Rose Creek was incorporated in 1899.

Geography

Demographics

2010 census
As of the census of 2010, there were 394 people, 162 households, and 111 families living in the city. The racial makeup of the city was 97.2% White, 0.3% Native American, 0.8% from other races, and 1.8% from two or more races. Hispanic or Latino of any race were 2.0% of the population.

There were 162 households, of which 32.7% had children under the age of 18 living with them, 55.6% were married couples living together, 8.6% had a female householder with no husband present, 4.3% had a male householder with no wife present, and 31.5% were non-families. 26.5% of all households were made up of individuals, and 12.3% had someone living alone who was 65 years of age or older. The average household size was 2.43 and the average family size was 2.96.

The median age in the city was 40 years. 28.4% of residents were under the age of 18; 6.3% were between the ages of 18 and 24; 21.6% were from 25 to 44; 27% were from 45 to 64; and 16.8% were 65 years of age or older. The gender makeup of the city was 48.5% male and 51.5% female.

2000 census
As of the census of 2000, there were 354 people, 143 households, and 99 families living in the city. The racial makeup of the city was 100.00% White. Hispanic or Latino of any race were 0.85% of the population.

There were 143 households, out of which 32.2% had children under the age of 18 living with them, 61.5% were married couples living together, 4.9% had a female householder with no husband present, and 30.1% were non-families. 28.7% of all households were made up of individuals, and 19.6% had someone living alone who was 65 years of age or older.  The average household size was 2.48 and the average family size was 3.03.

In the city, the population was spread out, with 26.0% under the age of 18, 8.5% from 18 to 24, 24.9% from 25 to 44, 18.1% from 45 to 64, and 22.6% who were 65 years of age or older.  The median age was 39 years. For every 100 females, there were 97.8 males.  For every 100 females age 18 and over, there were 88.5 males.

The median income for a household in the city was $42,841, and the median income for a family was $50,750. Males had a median income of $32,031 versus $22,321 for females. The per capita income for the city was $19,484.  About 2.1% of families and 4.4% of the population were below the poverty line, including none of those under age 18 and 9.8% of those age 65 or over.

References

Further reading

Cities in Mower County, Minnesota
Cities in Minnesota